Gorji (also Romanized as Gorjī) is a village in Pachehlak-e Gharbi Rural District, in the Central District of Azna County, Lorestan Province, Iran. At the 2006 census, its population was 1,980, in 431 families.
Gorji  is one of the villages of Lorestan province, located in the central part of the city of Azna. Gorji  is located in the village of Pachalak. -The villagers are dating back to the Safavid period, when some of the Georgians of Qazvin (the capital of that Safavid period) are displaced and the name of the village is taken from them. These Georgians founded the villages of the Ten Azna . Karitlan and Burjeleh, Cheghazal and Cheghaghoni and Cheghasidee. The last two villages were destroyed in the 1281 solar year's earthquake.

The village's population in the 2006 census was 1980 (431 households).

Previously, the Gorji  village was located near the Azna River, which was ruined by floods in the past, and its hard-working people re-established the Georgian village above the former village. Georgian has a fort in the north and near the white mountain that is known as the Georgian castle.

References 

Towns and villages in Azna County